Valour Football Club is a Canadian professional soccer club based in Winnipeg, Manitoba. The club competes in the Canadian Premier League and plays its home matches at IG Field.

The team is coached by Phillip Dos Santos and community owned through the Winnipeg Football Club.

History

On May 6, 2017, Winnipeg was one of two cities accepted by the Canadian Soccer Association for professional club membership when the Canadian Premier League was unanimously approved. It was confirmed that Canadian Football League clubs the Winnipeg Blue Bombers and the Hamilton Tiger-Cats were behind the ownership groups. Wade Miller, CEO of the Winnipeg Football Club, was named as the club's president.

In May 2018, it was reported that the club would be called Valour FC. On June 6, 2018 the club was officially unveiled as the fourth team to join the Canadian Premier League. As well as confirming its place in the league for the 2019 launch season, the club also revealed its crest, colours and branding. On June 26, the club named Rob Gale as the first head coach and general manager.

In the overall standings, Valour ranked 6th of 7 teams in 2019, 6th of 8 teams in 2020, and 5th of 8 teams in 2021. On September 23, 2021, while in 5th place, Valour FC sacked head coach Rob Gale and named Phillip Dos Santos as his replacement.

Stadium 

The club plays its home games at IG Field, a 33,234-seat Canadian football stadium. The stadium opened in 2013 on the University of Manitoba campus next to University Stadium. The stadium is also used by the Winnipeg Blue Bombers, the University of Manitoba Bisons football team, and the Winnipeg Rifles.

Crest and colours
The club's identity is heavily linked to the story of Winnipeg's Valour Road, and named to recognize Corporal Leo Clarke, Sergeant-Major Frederick William Hall, and Lieutenant Robert Shankland, who all lived on the same street and received the Victoria Cross for acts of bravery during the First World War.

The letter "V" in the centre of the crest emulates a folded medal ribbon and also represents the meeting of the Red River and Assiniboine River in Winnipeg. The right side of the "V" creates a "W" for Winnipeg, and the circle under the "V" is in the shape of the Victoria Cross medal. The wheat at the top of the crest represents Manitoba's agricultural industry.

The official club colours are maroon, gold and black (branded by the club as "Valour maroon," "wheat gold," and "earth black"). These colours symbolize the ribbon of the Victoria Cross and the wheat fields and soil of the Canadian Prairies.

Youth 
On August 8, 2018, Valour FC Elite Girls (formerly the Manitoba Blizzard) was founded to give girls in Winnipeg an opportunity to travel to college showcases in the U.S and Canada, while getting educated on the recruiting process. The team will be led by Head Coach Jim Zinko and Manager Trevor Kidd. Training begins in the fall, while the Valour FC Elite Girls competition season runs from late November into April.

Club culture 

The club's mascot leans heavily on imagery of the Victoria Cross, being a lion named 'Vic'. He wears the club's colours on a t-shirt, shorts, and wristbands.

Red River Rising Supporters group first met at Nicolino's Restaurant in January 2017, before a Winnipeg team was announced. The group met regularly in anticipation of an eventual Winnipeg team and now occupy section 144 at IG Field. The section is known as The Trench.

Players and staff

Roster

Current staff

Head coaches

Club captains

Records

Year-by-year 

1. Average attendance include statistics from league matches only.
2. Top goalscorer(s) includes all goals scored in league season, league playoffs, Canadian Championship, CONCACAF League, and other competitive continental matches.

All-time most appearances 

Note: Bold indicates active player

References

External links

 

 
Canadian Premier League teams
Association football clubs established in 2017
Soccer clubs in Winnipeg
2017 establishments in Manitoba